In computer science, a semaphore is a variable or abstract data type used to control access to a common resource by multiple threads and avoid critical section problems in a concurrent system such as a multitasking operating system. Semaphores are a type of synchronization primitive. A trivial semaphore is a plain variable that is changed (for example, incremented or decremented, or toggled) depending on programmer-defined conditions.

A useful way to think of a semaphore as used in a real-world system is as a record of how many units of a particular resource are available, coupled with operations to adjust that record safely (i.e., to avoid race conditions) as units are acquired or become free, and, if necessary, wait until a unit of the resource becomes available. 

Semaphores are a useful tool in the prevention of race conditions; however, their use is not a guarantee that a program is free from these problems. Semaphores which allow an arbitrary resource count are called counting semaphores, while semaphores which are restricted to the values 0 and 1 (or locked/unlocked, unavailable/available) are called binary semaphores and are used to implement locks.

The semaphore concept was invented by Dutch computer scientist Edsger Dijkstra in 1962 or 1963, when Dijkstra and his team were developing an operating system for the  Electrologica X8. That system eventually became known as THE multiprogramming system.

Library analogy
Suppose a physical library has 10 identical study rooms, to be used by one student at a time. Students must request a room from the front desk if they wish to use a study room. If no rooms are free, students wait at the desk until someone relinquishes a room. When a student has finished using a room, the student must return to the desk and indicate that one room has become free.

In the simplest implementation, the clerk at the front desk knows only the number of free rooms available, which they only know correctly if all of the students actually use their room while they have signed up for them and return them when they're done. When a student requests a room, the clerk decreases this number. When a student releases a room, the clerk increases this number. The room can be used for as long as desired, and so it is not possible to book rooms ahead of time.

In this scenario the front desk count-holder represents a counting semaphore, the rooms are the resource, and the students represent processes/threads. The value of the semaphore in this scenario is initially 10, with all rooms empty. When a student requests a room, they are granted access, and the value of the semaphore is changed to 9. After the next student comes, it drops to 8, then 7 and so on. If someone requests a room and the current value of the semaphore is 0, they are forced to wait until a room is freed (when the count is increased from 0). If one of the rooms was released, but there are several students waiting, then any method can be used to select the one who will occupy the room (like FIFO or randomly picking one). And of course, a student needs to inform the clerk about releasing their room only after really leaving it, otherwise, there can be an awkward situation when such student is in the process of leaving the room (they are packing their textbooks, etc.) and another student enters the room before they leave it.

Important observations
When used to control access to a pool of resources, a semaphore tracks only how many resources are free; it does not keep track of which of the resources are free. Some other mechanism (possibly involving more semaphores) may be required to select a particular free resource.

The paradigm is especially powerful because the semaphore count may serve as a useful trigger for a number of different actions. The librarian above may turn the lights off in the study hall when there are no students remaining, or may place a sign that says the rooms are very busy when most of the rooms are occupied.

The success of the protocol requires applications to follow it correctly. Fairness and safety are likely to be compromised (which practically means a program may behave slowly, act erratically, hang or crash) if even a single process acts incorrectly. This includes:
 requesting a resource and forgetting to release it;
 releasing a resource that was never requested;
 holding a resource for a long time without needing it;
 using a resource without requesting it first (or after releasing it).

Even if all processes follow these rules, multi-resource deadlock may still occur when there are different resources managed by different semaphores and when processes need to use more than one resource at a time, as illustrated by the dining philosophers problem.

Semantics and implementation
Counting semaphores are equipped with two operations, historically denoted as P and V (see  for alternative names). Operation V increments the semaphore S, and operation P decrements it.

The value of the semaphore S is the number of units of the resource that are currently available. The P operation wastes time or sleeps until a resource protected by the semaphore becomes available, at which time the resource is immediately claimed. The V operation is the inverse: it makes a resource available again after the process has finished using it.
One important property of semaphore S is that its value cannot be changed except by using the V and P operations.

 : Decrements the value of semaphore variable by 1. If the new value of the semaphore variable is negative, the process executing  is blocked (i.e., added to the semaphore's queue). Otherwise, the process continues execution, having used a unit of the resource.
 : Increments the value of semaphore variable by 1. After the increment, if the pre-increment value was negative (meaning there are processes waiting for a resource), it transfers a blocked process from the semaphore's waiting queue to the ready queue.

Many operating systems provide efficient semaphore primitives that unblock a waiting process when the semaphore is incremented. This means that processes do not waste time checking the semaphore value unnecessarily.

The counting semaphore concept can be extended with the ability to claim or return more than one "unit" from the semaphore, a technique implemented in Unix. The modified V and P operations are as follows, using square brackets to indicate atomic operations, i.e., operations which appear indivisible from the perspective of other processes:

 function V(semaphore S, integer I):
     [S ← S + I]
 
 function P(semaphore S, integer I):
     repeat:
         [if S ≥ I:
         S ← S − I
         break]

However, the remainder of this section refers to semaphores with unary V and P operations, unless otherwise specified.

To avoid starvation, a semaphore has an associated queue of processes (usually with FIFO semantics). If a process performs a P operation on a semaphore that has the value zero, the process is added to the semaphore's queue and its execution is suspended. When another process increments the semaphore by performing a V operation, and there are processes on the queue, one of them is removed from the queue and resumes execution. When processes have different priorities the queue may be ordered by priority, so that the highest priority process is taken from the queue first.

If the implementation does not ensure atomicity of the increment, decrement and comparison operations, then there is a risk of increments or decrements being forgotten, or of the semaphore value becoming negative. Atomicity may be achieved by using a machine instruction that is able to read, modify and write the semaphore in a single operation. In the absence of such a hardware instruction, an atomic operation may be synthesized through the use of a software mutual exclusion algorithm. On uniprocessor systems, atomic operations can be ensured by temporarily suspending preemption or disabling hardware interrupts. This approach does not work on multiprocessor systems where it is possible for two programs sharing a semaphore to run on different processors at the same time. To solve this problem in a multiprocessor system a locking variable can be used to control access to the semaphore. The locking variable is manipulated using a test-and-set-lock command.

Examples

Trivial example
Consider a variable A and a boolean variable S. A is only accessed when S is marked true. Thus, S is a semaphore for A.

One can imagine a stoplight signal (S) just before a train station (A). In this case, if the signal is green, then one can enter the train station. If it is yellow or red (or any other color), the train station cannot be accessed.

Login queue
Consider a system that can only support ten users (S=10). Whenever a user logs in, P is called, decrementing the semaphore S by 1. Whenever a user logs out, V is called, incrementing S by 1 representing a login slot that has become available. When S is 0, any users wishing to log in must wait until S increases; the login request is enqueued onto a FIFO queue until a slot is freed. Mutual exclusion is used to ensure that requests are enqueued in order. Whenever S increases (login slots available), a login request is dequeued, and the user owning the request is allowed to log in. If S is already greater than 0, then login requests are immediately dequeued.

Producer–consumer problem

In the producer–consumer problem, one process (the producer) generates data items and another process (the consumer) receives and uses them. They communicate using a queue of maximum size N and are subject to the following conditions:
 the consumer must wait for the producer to produce something if the queue is empty;
 the producer must wait for the consumer to consume something if the queue is full.

The semaphore solution to the producer–consumer problem tracks the state of the queue with two semaphores: emptyCount, the number of empty places in the queue, and fullCount, the number of elements in the queue. To maintain integrity, emptyCount may be lower (but never higher) than the actual number of empty places in the queue, and fullCount may be lower (but never higher) than the actual number of items in the queue. Empty places and items represent two kinds of resources, empty boxes and full boxes, and the semaphores emptyCount and fullCount maintain control over these resources.

The binary semaphore useQueue ensures that the integrity of the state of the queue itself is not compromised, for example by two producers attempting to add items to an empty queue simultaneously, thereby corrupting its internal state. Alternatively a mutex could be used in place of the binary semaphore.

The emptyCount is initially N, fullCount is initially 0, and useQueue is initially 1.

The producer does the following repeatedly:

 produce:
     P(emptyCount)
     P(useQueue)
     putItemIntoQueue(item)
     V(useQueue)
     V(fullCount)

The consumer does the following repeatedly

 consume:
     P(fullCount)
     P(useQueue)
     item ← getItemFromQueue()
     V(useQueue)
     V(emptyCount)

Below is a substantive example:
 A single consumer enters its critical section. Since fullCount is 0, the consumer blocks.
 Several producers enter the producer critical section. No more than N producers may enter their critical section due to emptyCount constraining their entry.
 The producers, one at a time, gain access to the queue through useQueue and deposit items in the queue.
 Once the first producer exits its critical section, fullCount is incremented, allowing one consumer to enter its critical section.

Note that emptyCount may be much lower than the actual number of empty places in the queue, for example in the case where many producers have decremented it but are waiting their turn on useQueue before filling empty places. Note that emptyCount + fullCount ≤ N  always holds, with equality if and only if no producers or consumers are executing their critical sections.

Operation names
The canonical names V and P come from the initials of Dutch words. V is generally explained as verhogen ("increase"). Several explanations have been offered for P, including proberen ("to test" or "to try"), passeren ("pass"), and pakken ("grab"). Dijkstra's earliest paper on the subject gives passering ("passing") as the meaning for P, and vrijgave ("release") as the meaning for V. It also mentions that the terminology is taken from that used in railroad signals. Dijkstra subsequently wrote that he intended P to stand for prolaag, short for probeer te verlagen, literally "try to reduce", or to parallel the terms used in the other case, "try to decrease".

In ALGOL 68, the Linux kernel, and in some English textbooks, the V and P operations are called, respectively, up and down. In software engineering practice, they are often called signal and wait, release and acquire (which the standard Java library uses), or post and pend. Some texts call them vacate and procure to match the original Dutch initials.

Semaphores vs. mutexes
A mutex is a locking mechanism that sometimes uses the same basic implementation as the binary semaphore. The differences between them are in how they are used. While a binary semaphore may be colloquially referred to as a mutex, a true mutex has a more specific use-case and definition, in that only the task that locked the mutex is supposed to unlock it. This constraint aims to handle some potential problems of using semaphores:
 Priority inversion: If the mutex knows who locked it and is supposed to unlock it, it is possible to promote the priority of that task whenever a higher-priority task starts waiting on the mutex.
 Premature task termination: Mutexes may also provide deletion safety, where the task holding the mutex cannot be accidentally deleted. 
 Termination deadlock: If a mutex-holding task terminates for any reason, the OS can release the mutex and signal waiting tasks of this condition.
 Recursion deadlock: a task is allowed to lock a reentrant mutex multiple times as it unlocks it an equal number of times.
 Accidental release: An error is raised on the release of the mutex if the releasing task is not its owner.

See also
 Synchronization (computer science)
 Cigarette smokers problem
 Dining philosophers problem
 Readers-writers problem
 Sleeping barber problem
 Monitor
 Spurious wakeup

References

External links

Introductions 

 Hilsheimer, Volker (2004). "Implementing a Read/Write Mutex" (Web page). Qt Quarterly, Issue 11 - Q3 2004

References 
 (September 1965)

Computer science
Concurrency control
Concurrency (computer science)
Parallel computing
Computer-mediated communication
Edsger W. Dijkstra
Dutch inventions